Radical 5 or radical second meaning "second" is one of 6 of the 214 Kangxi radicals that are composed of only one stroke. However, this radical is mainly used to categorize miscellaneous characters otherwise not belonging to any radical, mainly featuring a hook or fold, and 乙 is the character with the least amount of strokes.

In the ancient Chinese cyclic character numeral system, 乙 represents the second Celestial stem (天干 tiāngān).

In the Kangxi Dictionary, there are 42 characters (out of 49,030) to be found under this radical.

Usually, only several out of the 15 variant components are listed under radical  in dictionary indexes.

Evolution

Derived characters

However, in most Japanese dictionaries,  is treated as a variant of Radical 213 and indexed Radical 213 + 0 strokes.

Literature

References

External links

Unihan Database - U+4E59

005
005